G. M. Mushfiqur Rahman Bir Uttom (1966–1989) was a lieutenant in the Bangladesh Army. Rahman was one of two military officers who were awarded Bir Uttom, the other being Brigadier Jamil Uddin Ahmad who died while trying to prevent the assassination of President Sheikh Mujibur Rahman, after the end of Bangladesh Liberation War.

Biography 
Rahman was born on 30 November 1966 in Satkhira District, East Pakistan, Pakistan. He was commissioned from the Bangladesh Military Academy in 1986 along with 15 Long Course. He was posted in 1 Field Artillery Regiment of Bangladesh Army in Chittagong Hill Tracts. 

On 8 September 1989, Rahman led a 17-member team of Bangladesh Army soldiers and attacked a Shanti Bahini camp during the Chittagong Hill Tracts conflict. Lieutenant Rahman was injured during the clash and died on that day at 8:15 am. He was posthumously awarded with the Bir Uttom award on 8 September 1989. Shaheed Lt. G. M. Mushfique Bir Uttam High School in Chittagong was named after him.

References

Bangladesh Army officers
1966 births
1989 deaths
Recipients of the Bir Uttom
People from Satkhira District
People murdered in Bangladesh
Deaths by firearm in Bangladesh